Hanover County is a county in the Commonwealth of Virginia. As of the 2020 census, the population was 109,979. Its county seat is Hanover Courthouse.

Hanover County is a part of the Greater Richmond Region.

History 

Located in the western Tidewater region of Virginia, Hanover County was created on November 26, 1719, from the area of New Kent County called St. Peter's Parish.  It was named for the Electorate of Hanover in Germany, because King George I of Great Britain was Elector of Hanover at the time. The county was developed by planters moving west from the Virginia tidewater, where soils had been exhausted by tobacco monoculture.

Hanover County was the birthplace and home of noted American statesman Patrick Henry. He reportedly married Sarah Shelton in the parlor of her family's house, Rural Plains, also known as Shelton House. At the Hanover Courthouse, Henry argued the case of the Parson's Cause in 1763, attacking the British Crown's attempt to set the salaries of clergy in the colony regardless of conditions in the local economy. The historic Hanover Courthouse is pictured in the county seal. Hanover County was also the birthplace of Henry Clay, who became known as a politician in Kentucky, author of the Missouri Compromise of 1820, and Secretary of State.

The Chickahominy River forms the border of the county in the Mechanicsville area. During the American Civil War and the 1862 Peninsula Campaign, the Union Army approached the river and could hear the bells of Richmond's churches. But they learned that the river was a major obstacle. Union General George B. McClellan failed in his attempt to get all his troops across it, intending to overwhelm the outnumbered Confederate forces defending Richmond.  His failure to take Richmond has been said to have prolonged the war by almost 3 years. Hanover County was the site of Civil War battles due to its location between Richmond and northern Virginia, including the Seven Days Battles of the Peninsula Campaign and Battle of Cold Harbor in 1864.

The incorporated town of Ashland is located within Hanover County. Ashland is the second and current home of Randolph-Macon College.

In 1953, Barksdale Theatre was founded at the historic Hanover Tavern. It was the nation's first dinner theater and central Virginia's first professional theatre organization. The Barksdale company continues to produce live theatre at the Tavern, as well as at several locations in Richmond. It is recognized today as Central Virginia's leading professional theatre.

Kings Dominion amusement park opened in 1975 in Doswell and added to the county's economy. In January 2007, America's Promise named Hanover County as one of the top 100 communities for youth.

Geography 

Adjacent counties
 Caroline County (north)
 Goochland County (southwest)
 Henrico County (south)
 King William County (northeast)
 Louisa County (west)
 New Kent County (east)
 Spotsylvania County (northwest)

Major highways

Demographics

2020 census

Note: the US Census treats Hispanic/Latino as an ethnic category. This table excludes Latinos from the racial categories and assigns them to a separate category. Hispanics/Latinos can be of any race.

2010 Census
As of the 2010 United States Census, there were 99,863 people living in the county. 86.7% were White, 9.3% Black or African American, 1.4% Asian, 0.4% Native American, 0.8% of some other race and 1.5% of two or more races; 2.1% were Hispanic or Latino (of any race).

As of the census of 2000, there were 86,320 people, 31,121 households, and 24,461 families living in the county. The population density was 183 people per square mile (71/km2). There were 32,196 housing units at an average density of 68 per square mile (26/km2). The racial makeup of the county was 88.32% White, 9.34% Black or African American, 0.33% Native American, 0.79% Asian, 0.01% Pacific Islander, 0.37% from other races, and 0.83% from two or more races. 0.98% of the population were Hispanic or Latino of any race.

There were 31,121 households, out of which 39.50% had children under the age of 18 living with them, 66.40% were married couples living together, 9.30% had a female householder with no husband present, and 21.40% were non-families; 17.70% of all households were made up of individuals, and 6.80% had someone living alone who was 65 years of age or older. The average household size was 2.71, and the average family size was 3.07.

In the county, the population was spread out, with 27.10% under the age of 18, 6.90% from 18 to 24, 30.70% from 25 to 44, 24.80% from 45 to 64, and 10.60% who were 65 years of age or older. The median age was 37 years. For every 100 females there were 96.90 males; for every 100 females age 18 and over, there were 92.80 males.

The median income for a household in the county was $77,550, and the median income for a family was $90,812. The median income was $46,864 for males and $32,662 for females. The per capita income for the county was $34,241. About 3.54% of families and 5.50% of the population were below the poverty line, including 3.90% of those under age 18 and 5.80% of those age 65 or over.

Government

Board of supervisors
 Ashland District: Faye O. Prichard (D)
 Beaverdam District: Aubrey M. "Bucky" Stanley (R)
 Chickahominy District: Angela C. Kelly-Wiecek (R)
 Cold Harbor District: F. Michael Herzberg (R)
 Henry District: Sean M. Davis (R)
 Mechanicsville District: W. Canova Peterson (R)
 South Anna District: Susan P. Dibble (R)

Constitutional officers
 Clerk of the Circuit Court: Frank D. Hargrove, Jr. (R)
 Commissioner of the Revenue: T. Scott Harris (R)
 Commonwealth's Attorney: R. E. "Trip" Chalkley, III (R)
 Sheriff: David R. Hines (R)
 Treasurer: M. Scott Miller (R)

Law enforcement

The Hanover County Sheriff's Office (HCSO) is the primary law enforcement agency in Hanover County, Virginia. The HCSO was created shortly after the county was formed on November 26, 1720. The Sheriff is David R. Hines.

State and federal
Hanover County is represented by Republicans Ryan McDougle and Siobhan Dunnavant and Democrat Jennifer McClellan in the Virginia Senate, Republican Buddy Fowler and Scott Wyatt in the Virginia House of Delegates and Republican Rob Wittman in the U.S. House of Representatives.

Hanover County is a strongly Republican county; no Democratic presidential candidate has won it since Harry Truman in 1948, and it was one of 4 counties that did not vote for Mark Warner in his 2008 landslide.

Education
Hanover County has fifteen elementary schools, four middle schools, four high schools, one alternative school, and one technology school. The four high schools are Atlee High School, Hanover High School, Mechanicsville High School, and Patrick Henry High School. Forbes magazine named Hanover County as one of the top fifty counties in the United States for student achievement vs. cost per student.

Economy

Hanover County has the lowest real estate property tax rate in the Richmond Region, which makes for a competitive business location. Some of the major businesses that have taken advantage of the tax rate include: Bass Pro Shops, FedEx Ground, and The Vitamin Shoppe. These businesses located in the county with help from the Hanover County Economic Development and the Greater Richmond Partnership, regional economic development organizations.

Top employers

Communities

Town
 Ashland

Census-designated places
 Hanover (Hanover Courthouse)
 Mechanicsville

Other unincorporated communities

 Atlee
 Beaverdam
 Brown Grove   
 Doswell
 Elmont
 Montpelier
 Old Church
 Rockville
 Studley

Notable natives and residents
 Henry Clay (1777-1852), U.S. Secretary of State, Speaker of the House of Representatives, U.S. Senator from Kentucky.
 Samuel Davies (1723-1761), came from Pennsylvania to lead and minister to the religious dissenters in Hanover County, during the First Great Awakening. He set up licensed congregations starting in 1743, eventually helped found the first presbytery in Virginia (the Presbytery of Hanover), evangelized slaves (remarkable in its time), and influenced the young Patrick Henry, who traveled with his mother to listen to sermons.
 London Ferrill (1789–1854), African-American antebellum Baptist minister. Born here, he gained freedom from slavery as a carpenter and migrated with his wife to Lexington, Kentucky. Ordained by the First Baptist Church, in 1824 he was called as the second preacher of the First African Baptist Church, the oldest black Baptist church west of the Allegheny Mountains. He served for 31 years, building the congregation to 1,820 members by 1850, when it was the largest church in Kentucky, white or black.
 Patrick Henry (1736-1799), American statesman and lawyer, noted for his "Give me liberty, or give me death!" speech in 1775.
 Thomas Hinde (1737-1828), personal physician to Patrick Henry and physician during the American Revolutionary War.
 Richard Clough Anderson Sr. (1750-1826), Lt. Col. in American Revolutionary War.  Land surveyor of Virginia Military District.  Born in Goldmine, Hanover County, Virginia.
 Thomas S. Hinde (1785-1846), real estate speculator, Methodist minister, and founder of Mount Carmel, Illinois.
 Susan Archer Weiss (1822–1917), poet, author, artist
 Sheri Holman (1966-), award-winning novelist and screenwriter
 Jock Jones (1968-), former NFL player, Cleveland Browns and Arizona Cardinals
 Dolley Madison (1768–1849), First Lady, spent much of her childhood in Hanover County
 Jason Mraz (1977-), Grammy Award-winning singer-songwriter
 Damien Woody (1977-), ESPN analyst and former NFL player and 2x Super Bowl Champion, New England Patriots, Detroit Lions, and New York Jets

See also
 Hanover County Municipal Airport
 Hanover County Sheriff’s Office
 Hanover tomato
 National Register of Historic Places listings in Hanover County, Virginia

References

 Hanover County District Information

External links 
 Hanover County Economic Development
 Hanover Herald-Progress newspaper
 Mechanicsville Local newspaper
 Mechanicsville News

 
1720 establishments in Virginia
Virginia counties
Geography of Richmond, Virginia
Populated places established in 1720